Love in a Village is a ballad opera in three acts that was composed and arranged by Thomas Arne. A pastiche, the work contains 42 musical numbers of which only five were newly composed works by Arne. The other music is made up of 13 pieces borrowed from Arne's earlier stage works, a new overture was by C. F. Abel, and 23 songs by other composers, including Bishop, Boyce, Geminiani, Giordani, and Galuppi, albeit with new texts. The English libretto, by Isaac Bickerstaffe, is based on Charles Johnson’s 1729 play The Village Opera. The opera premiered at the Royal Opera, Covent Garden in London on 8 December 1762. One of its best known songs is the Miller of Dee.

History
Love in a Village was received enthusiastically at its premiere and became one of Arne's more popular operas, enjoying 40 performances in its first season alone. The work's success  began a vogue for pastiche opera in England that lasted well into the 19th century. The opera has subsequently been revived numerous times, both during Arne's lifetime and after. A notable revival occurred at the Lyric Hammersmith in London in 1928, using an adaptation by Alfred Reynolds. The opera was first published in 1763, but without recitative or librettos. A copy of the full score, which is partly in the composer’s hand, also survives and is in the collection of the library at the Royal College of Music. Most of the music displays a simple and lyrical nature with the exception of the music for Rosetta. Rosetta, a role written for Arne's lover Charlotte Brent, requires a gifted coloratura soprano, particularly for the aria "The traveller benighted" which has several challenging passages containing wide vocal leaps, fast runs, and trills.

Roles

Synopsis
The heroine of the story, Rosetta, is fearful of her impending marriage to a man she has never met. Worried that she will be miserable, she runs away from home and acquires a position as a chambermaid in the home of Justice Woodcock. Meanwhile, the son of Sir William Meadows, Thomas, is in an equivalent situation. He also avoids his impending marriage by posing as a gardener in the Justice's household. Rosetta and Thomas meet and soon fall in love. However, both of their families are determined to make them marry their intended future spouses. Just as all seems hopeless, Sir William arrives and reveals that the young lovers have in fact been betrothed to each other the whole time.

Arias 

Act 1
Overture
Hope, thou nurse of young desire [duet]
Whence can you inherit
My heart’s my own
When once love’s subtle
O had I been by fate decreed
Gentle youth, ah! Tell me why
Still in hopes to get the better
There was a jolly miller
Let gay ones and great
The honest heart whose thoughts are clear
Well, well, say no more
Cupid God of soft persuasion
How happy were my days till now
I pray ye gentles list to me [“a medley”]

Act 2
We women like poor Indians trade
Think my fairest how delay
Believe me dear aunt
When I follow’d a lass
Let rakes and libertines resigned [duet]
How blest the maid whose bosom
In vain I ev’ry art essay
Begone, I agree [duet]
Oh how shall I in language weak
Young I am and sore afraid
Oons! Neighbour ne’er blush
My Dolly was the fairest thing
Was ever poor fellow so plagued
Cease gay seducers
Since Hodge proves ungrateful
In love should there meet a fond pair
Well, come let us hear [trio]

Act 3
The world is a well furnished table
‘Tis not wealth, it is not birth
The traveller benighted
If ever a fond inclination
A plague of those wenches
How much superior beauty awes
When we see a lover languish
All I with her obtaining [duet]
If ever I’m catched
Go naughty man
Hence with cares, complaints and frowning

Sources

1762 operas
Operas
Ballad operas
Operas by Thomas Arne
Plays by Isaac Bickerstaffe
English-language operas
Opera world premieres at the Theatre Royal, Covent Garden